Negombo Divisional Secretariat is a  Divisional Secretariat of Western Province, Sri Lanka.

References
 Divisional Secretariats Portal

Divisional Secretariats of Gampaha District
Negombo